Benedictus Gotthelf Teubner (born 16 June 1784 in Grosskrausnik in Luckau in Lower Lusatia; died 21 January 1856 in Leipzig) was a German bookseller and the founder of a publishing company.

Life 
Teubner was a printer. In 1811 he brought the  printing press to Leipzig, which he would bring to importance within Germany. He founded another press in Dresden towards the end of the 18th century. The addition of a publishing business to the printing house followed in 1824, which published in the areas of philology and higher education in Germany. The well-known series of classical publications known as the Bibliotheca scriptorum graecorum et romanorum Teubneriana emerged from this. In Leipzig Teubner was a member of the  Masonic lodge.

Honors 
For the 1840 book History of the Art of Printing (""), Friedrich Wilhelm IV awarded Teubner a golden tribute medal in recognition of "the typographical value of the work", and the English royal couple, to whom a copy had been presented, awarded him a golden coronation medal. King Frederick Augustus of Saxony received the dedication.

A street in Leipzig is named after Teubner.

See also 
 Stiftung Benedictus Gotthelf Teubner
  (B. G. Teubner Verlag)
 Vieweg+Teubner Verlag

References

Further reading

External links 
 Literature by and about Benedictus Gotthelf Teubner in the catalog of the German National Library
 Felix Klein und der Verlag B. G. Teubner. Anmerkungen zur Entstehung des mathematischen Verlagszweiges (Zum 175-jährigen Firmenjubiläum B. G. Teubner)

German printers
German booksellers
German Freemasons
1784 births
1856 deaths
19th-century German businesspeople
Businesspeople from Leipzig
19th-century publishers (people)